is a Japanese football player for SC Sagamihara.

Club statistics
Updated to 23 February 2016.

References

External links

Profile at SC Sagamihara

1990 births
Living people
Senshu University alumni
Association football people from Kagoshima Prefecture
Japanese footballers
J3 League players
Japan Football League players
Blaublitz Akita players
SC Sagamihara players
Association football midfielders